Type D personality, a concept used in the field of medical psychology, is defined as the joint tendency towards negative affectivity (e.g. worry, irritability, gloom) and social inhibition (e.g. reticence and a lack of self-assurance). The letter D stands for "distressed".

Characteristics
Individuals with a Type D personality have the tendency to experience increased negative emotions across time and situations and tend not to share these emotions with others, because of fear of rejection or disapproval. Johan Denollet, professor of Medical Psychology at Tilburg University, Tilburg, The Netherlands, developed the construct based on clinical observations in cardiac patients, empirical evidence, and existing theories of personality. The prevalence of Type D personality is 21% in the general population and ranges between 18% to 53% in cardiac patients.

Some early studies found that coronary artery disease (CAD) patients with a Type D personality have a worse prognosis following a myocardial infarction (MI) as compared to patients without a Type D personality. In some of these studies, Type D was associated with a 4-fold increased risk of mortality, recurrent MI, or sudden cardiac death, independently of traditional risk factors, such as disease severity. However, a number of subsequent, larger scale studies have failed to replicate these findings. Consequently, some researchers have argued that these earlier, small (and therefore potentially statistically underpowered) studies that appeared to link Type D personality to mortality in CHD and CVD patients may have inadvertently reached exaggerated or false conclusions.

Assessment
Type D personality can be assessed by means of a valid and reliable 14-item questionnaire, the Type D Scale (DS14). Seven items refer to negative affectivity, and seven items refer to social inhibition. People who score 10 points or more on both dimensions are classified as Type D. The DS14 can be applied in clinical practice for the risk stratification of cardiac patients.

Type D has also been addressed with respect to common somatic complaints in childhood.

See also 
 Neuroticism
 Psychosomatic medicine
 Type A and Type B personality theory

References 

Personality traits
Ischemic heart diseases